Ezekiel 1 is the first chapter of the Book of Ezekiel in the Hebrew Bible or the Old Testament of the Christian Bible. This book contains prophecies attributed to the prophet/priest Ezekiel, and is one of the Books of the Prophets. In the New King James Version, this chapter is sub-titled "Ezekiel’s Vision of God", and in the New International Version, "Ezekiel’s Inaugural Vision". In the text, the first verse refers to "visions" (plural).

Text

The original text of this chapter was written in the Hebrew language. This chapter is divided into 28 verses.

Textual witnesses
Some early manuscripts containing the text of this chapter in Hebrew are of the Masoretic Text tradition, which includes the Codex Cairensis (895), the Petersburg Codex of the Prophets (916), Aleppo Codex (10th century), and Codex Leningradensis (1008). Fragments containing parts of this chapter were found among the Dead Sea Scrolls including 4Q74 (4QEzek; 50 BCE–50 CE) with extant verses 10–13, 16–17, 19–24; and 11Q4 (11QEzek; 50 BCE–50 CE) with extant verses 8–10.

There is also a translation into Koine Greek known as the Septuagint, made in the last few centuries BCE. Extant ancient manuscripts of the Septuagint version include Codex Vaticanus (B; B; 4th century), Codex Alexandrinus (A; A; 5th century) and Codex Marchalianus (Q; Q; 6th century).

Superscription (1:1–3)

The first three verses form a superscription of the book, containing the identity of the prophet as well as the time and place that the prophecy was received and delivered. There are two distinct introductions: one in the first person (verse 1) and another in the third person (verses 2-3; the only two verses in the book written in the third person).

Verse 1
Now it came to pass in the thirtieth year, in the fourth month, in the fifth day of the month, as I was among the captives by the river of Chebar, that the heavens were opened, and I saw visions of God.
The first verse of the book announces that the writer received 'visions of God' while he was among the exiles 'by the river Chebar' in 'the thirtieth year'. The Syriac text refers to "a vision" (singular).

Rashi, a medieval French rabbi, suggests that the thirty years are counted "from the beginning of the jubilee cycle", the last of which was started "at the beginning of the eighteenth year of Josiah's reign; that is, the year that Hilkiah found the scroll" recounted in 2 Kings 22. This view is based on Seder Olam (chapter 26), and also based on Ezekiel 40:1: "In the twenty-fifth year of our exile, at the beginning of the year, on the tenth of the month," which the rabbis said (Arachin 12a) denoted the jubilee year, and which the prophet uses for his reference of time counting. The date corresponds to July 24, 568 BCE, based on an analysis by German theologian Bernhard Lang.

Verse 2
 In the fifth day of the month, which was the fifth year of king Jehoiachin's captivity,
 "In the fifth day of the month, which was the fifth year": Rashi wrote that this phrase, this verse and the next are not Ezekiel's words but an added interruption. The date (with unknown month) is calculated to the year 593-592 BCE, based on Lang's analysis, Jehoiachin's captivity having commenced with Nebuchadnezzar's deportation of the exiles after his successful siege of Jerusalem in 597 BCE.

Verse 3
The word of the Lord came expressly unto Ezekiel the priest, the son of Buzi,
in the land of the Chaldeans by the river Chebar;
and the hand of the Lord was there upon him.
"Came expressly" (Hebrew: היה היה): literally "is being", formed by the same word "hayah" twice; the word hayah means to "be", "become", "came to pass", "exist."

The Vision of the Throne-Chariot (1:4-28)
Ezekiel's first vision comes when a stormy wind blew in from the north, bringing with it a shiny cloud that contains 'Yahweh's chariot borne by supernatural creatures'. These "four living creatures" are identified in Ezekiel 10:20 as cherubim.

Verse 5

 Also out of the midst thereof came the likeness of four living creatures.
 And this was their appearance; they had the likeness of a man.
 "Living creatures": New Oxford Annotated Bible identified these as "Cherubim" (10:15, 20), although "uncharacteristically … [they] have four faces" (Ezekiel 1:10).

Verse 10
As for the likeness of their faces, they four had the face of a man, and the face of a lion, on the right side: and they four had the face of an ox on the left side; they four also had the face of an eagle.
With four faces in different directions simultaneously the creatures can move in any direction and also 'guard the blazing substance around which they stand'.

Verse 16
The appearance of the wheels and their workings was like the color of beryl, and all four had the same likeness. The appearance of their workings was, as it were, a wheel in the middle of a wheel.
This description (and also in verse 19) becomes the inspiration for the construction of the "Ezekiel Airship".
"Beryl" or "topaz": some kind of "precious, gold-colored stone".

Verse 19
And when the living creatures went, the wheels went beside them; and when the living creatures rose from the earth, the wheels rose.
This description (and also in verse 16) becomes the inspiration for the construction of the "Ezekiel Airship".

Verse 26
 And above the firmament that was over their heads was the likeness of a throne,
 as the appearance of a sapphire stone:
 and upon the likeness of the throne was the likeness as the appearance of a man above upon it.
 "Sapphire" (Hebrew: ספיר ): "a kind of gem"; "lapis lazuli" (Ezekiel 28:13).  records "a pavement of sapphire" under the feet of God.

Verse 27
Also from the appearance of His waist and upward I saw, as it were, the color of amber with the appearance of fire all around within it; and from the appearance of His waist and downward I saw, as it were, the appearance of fire with brightness all around.
Ezekiel saw a human form that shines as if with "fire" (Hebrew: hasmal).

Verse 28

 As the appearance of the bow that is in the cloud in the day of rain,
 so was the appearance of the brightness round about.
 This was the appearance of the likeness of the glory of the Lord.
 And when I saw it, I fell upon my face,
 and I heard a voice of one that spake.
The brightness surrounding the human form in Ezekiel's vision looks like a rainbow, and as soon as he sees it, Ezekiel falls prostrate, because he recognizes it as 'the appearance of the likeness of the glory' of Yahweh. The whole report of the vision uses 'the unmistakable symbols of Yahweh's presence for an Israelite reader'.

See also

Related Bible parts: 2 Kings 24, 2 Chronicles 36, Isaiah 6, Jeremiah 29, Ezekiel 10, Ezekiel 11, John 12, Revelation 4, Revelation 21

Notes

References

Sources

External links

Jewish
Ezekiel 1 Hebrew with Parallel English
Ezekiel 1 Hebrew with Rashi's Commentary

Christian
Ezekiel 1 English Translation with Parallel Latin Vulgate

01
Theophanies in the Hebrew Bible
Cherubim